White British is an ethnicity classification used for the native white population identifying as English, Scottish, Welsh, Cornish, Northern Irish, or British in the United Kingdom Census. In the 2011 census, the White British population was 49,997,686, 81.5% of Great Britain's total population. For the United Kingdom entirely, due to different reporting measures within Northern Ireland which includes all those who identified as British with those who identified as Irish, an amalgamated total of 52,320,080 including those who identified as White Irish in Great Britain is given making up 82.8% of the population.

Census classifications
For the 2011 census, in England and Wales, the White self-classification option included a subcategory of "English/Welsh/Scottish/Northern Irish/British". In Scotland, the White category included "Scottish" and "Other British" options. In Northern Ireland, the White British classification did not appear, the only choice being 'White'.

The 2011 census for England, Wales and Scotland also included additional White ethnic classifications of White Irish, White Gypsy/Irish Traveller and White Other. There were calls for the 2011 national census in England and Wales to include an extra subcategory so people could identify their ethnic group as Cornish.

Demographics

Population and distribution
The White British census classification have their ages more evenly distributed in their population pyramid and have the highest per cent female population of all ethnic-based classifications. The following numbers were based on the 2011 census conducted in each country. All other census classifications have a higher percentage of their population under 16 and a lower percentage over 64.

According to the 2011 UK Census results, White British people make up the largest percentage of the population in rural areas, such as Allerdale (99.4%) and Copeland (99.3%) in Cumbria, Ryedale (99.4%) in North Yorkshire, North Norfolk (99.2%) and North Devon (99%). Cities across the UK regions with high White British populations include Swansea (91.5%), Kingston Upon Hull (89.7%), Plymouth (92.2%), Darlington (93.7%), Belfast (96.4% - NI classification "white"), Norwich (84.7%), Liverpool (84.8%) and Chelmsford (90.0%). The highest unitary authority with a White British proportion is Redcar and Cleveland (97.6%) followed by Northumberland (97.2%), Hartlepool and County Durham (both 96.6%). The highest county is Lincolnshire (93%) followed by Nottinghamshire, Norfolk and Worcestershire, all above 92%. Within the London region, Havering has the highest White British percentage with 83.3%, followed by Bromley with 77.4%, Bexley with 77.3% and Richmond upon Thames with 71.4%.

Since the 2011 UK Census was returned, London contains by far the lowest percentage of English and other White British people of all the UK regions, where they make up less than half of the population in 24 of the 32 boroughs, including: Newham (16.7%), Brent (18.0%), Ealing (30.4%), Harrow (30.9%), Tower Hamlets (31.2%), Westminster (35.2%) and Hackney (36.2%). Despite this, the White British population in London is still higher in numbers than the entirety of Wales or Northern Ireland, owing to London's high overall population. The city with the lowest White British population as a percentage is Leicester (45.1%) - also the only city below 50% without counting Westminster - while the lowest for unitary authorities is Slough (34.5%), followed by Luton (44.6%). The local ward with the lowest percentage is Southall Broadway in Ealing (3.5%), followed by Southall Green in Ealing; Green Street East, Green Street West, and East Ham North, all in Newham, which are the only wards below five percent.

Population by local authority

Population in counties

Population in city districts

Population in school children

Population in births

Economic status and education
According to official UK Government figures from 2016, the employment rate for White British people stood at 75%, with the overall employment rate in the UK standing at 74%. UK Government figures also demonstrate that 31% of White British people work in professional and managerial occupations, higher than the Mixed (30%), Pakistani/Bangladeshi (27%) and Black (25%) groups, but lower than the Indian ethnic group (43%).

At GCSE level, official UK Government statistics state that 63% of White British pupils attained A* to C grades in English and Mathematics in the 2015–16 academic year, higher than Black Caribbean (51%) and Pakistani (58%) pupils, but lower than Bangladeshi (67%), Indian (77%) and Chinese (83%) pupils. According to a report by the Sutton Trust, "White working class pupils achieve the lowest grades at GCSE of any main ethnic group, with just a quarter of boys and a third of girls achieving 5 good GCSEs."

At A-Level, in the 2015–16 academic year, 11% of White British pupils achieved at least 3 'A' grades at A-Level; the only major ethnic groups to achieve the same benchmark at a higher rate were Indian (14%) and Chinese (24%) pupils.

Religion

Statistically, White British are more likely to be Christian than other ethnic-based classifications. According to the 2011 UK Census, White British are 64% Christian in England and Wales, mostly Anglican in England, while the percentage for all groups is about 59%. The percentage of White British who are Christians is lower in Scotland, at 55% (mainly Presbyterian there), whereas at least 54% of all Scots are Christian. The British country with the highest percentage is Northern Ireland, where white people are 94% Christian, while 93% of all usual residents are. About 27% of the White British population in England and Wales, and 36% in Scotland reported having "no religion". In Northern Ireland, the lowest percentage of white people who reported "no religion" in the census is about 5%. The 27% and 36% per cent figures for "no religion" are about the same for all groups. About 7% of the White British in England and Wales, and Scotland declined to state any religion.

Percentages of White population (as of 2011)

See also 

 Ethnic groups in the United Kingdom
 Demographics of the United Kingdom
 Demography of England
 Demographics of Scotland
 Demographics of Wales
 Demographics of Northern Ireland
 List of United Kingdom censuses
 Classification of ethnicity in the United Kingdom
 National Statistics Socio-economic Classification
 Genetic history of the British Isles
 Historical immigration to Great Britain
 List of English districts and their ethnic composition

Notes and references

Notes

References 

Ethnic groups in the United Kingdom
 
Articles with accessibility problems